James Hargrove Meredith (August 25, 1914 – December 8, 1988) was a United States district judge of the United States District Court for the Eastern District of Missouri.

Education and career

Born in Wedderburn, Oregon, Meredith received an Artium Baccalaureus degree from the University of Missouri in 1936 and a Bachelor of Laws from the University of Missouri School of Law in 1937. He was in private practice in Portageville, Missouri from 1937 to 1938. He was in private practice in New Madrid, Missouri from 1939 to 1941. He was an assistant prosecuting attorney of New Madrid County, Missouri from 1939 to 1941. He was a special agent for the Federal Bureau of Investigation in Los Angeles and San Francisco, California from 1942 to 1944. He was in the United States Navy during World War II, from 1944 to 1946. He was in private practice in Portageville from 1946 to 1949. He was a legal secretary to the Governor of Missouri from 1949 to 1950. He was chief counsel for the State Insurance Department of Missouri from 1950 to 1952. He was in private practice in St. Louis, Missouri from 1952 to 1962. He was in private practice in Washington, D.C. from 1961 to 1962.

Federal judicial service

Meredith was nominated by President John F. Kennedy on March 5, 1962, to a seat on the United States District Court for the Eastern District of Missouri vacated by Judge George Moore. He was confirmed by the United States Senate on March 16, 1962, and received his commission on March 17, 1962. He served as Chief Judge from 1971 to 1979. He assumed senior status on August 31, 1979. Meredith served in that capacity until his death on December 8, 1988, in St. Louis.

References

Sources
 

1914 births
1988 deaths
Judges of the United States District Court for the Eastern District of Missouri
United States district court judges appointed by John F. Kennedy
20th-century American judges
University of Missouri alumni
United States Navy personnel of World War II
People from Portageville, Missouri
20th-century American lawyers
People from New Madrid, Missouri
Military personnel from Missouri
Military personnel from Oregon
Judges of the United States Foreign Intelligence Surveillance Court